I Start Counting is a 1970 British coming-of-age drama thriller film directed by David Greene and starring Jenny Agutter and Bryan Marshall. Its plot follows a teenage girl who comes to suspect that her adult foster brother is a serial killer. It was based on the 1966 novel of the same name by Audrey Erskine Lindop.

The film was moderately controversial because of Agutter's squeaky-clean image and youth (16, playing a 14-year-old), when coupled with the film's sexual content.  It also included Simon Ward's first major film role.

Plot
Wynne Kinch (Agutter), an adopted 14-year-old girl, has a crush on her 32-year-old stepbrother, George (Bryan Marshall). While spying on George in the bathroom, Wynne notices he has several scratches on his back, and finds a jumper she made for him thrown in the rubbish, with blood on it; this leads her to suspect him of being the serial killer of several local teenage girls, who is still at large. Despite this belief, Wynne continues to have romantic sexual fantasies about George, and dreams of marrying him when she comes of legal age.

Throughout the film, she regularly visits the house she previously lived in with her family.

Later on, Wynne searches the back of George's van, hoping to find clues but is forced to stay inside and hide when he gets in and drives off. He drives to a house and Wynne discovers that he is having an affair with a mentally unstable woman (Lana Morris), whose blood was on the discarded jumper after she had slashed her wrists in a suicide attempt.

Wynne's best friend Corinne (Clare Sutcliffe) teases her about her crush on George and when the family goes out on a picnic, Corinne flirts with him; he gets angry at her for acting like a "pathetic little mini-tart" and pins her down roughly on the ground. Corinne runs off and later phones Wynne to tell her she will stay out all night with an unnamed boy who, she says, they both know. Wynne, worried about her friend, goes searching for her at her former home and finds Corinne's dead body. About to leave the house she is confronted and trapped inside by the bus conductor who Wynne and Corinne often meet on the bus. He confesses to having killed the girls. Wynne tries to escape. He chases her and she falls into the pond. While helping her out he breaks down in distress, at which point the police arrive.

The film ends with Wynne and George watching their old house being demolished.

Cast

Production

Filming
The film was shot at Bray Studios in Berkshire and on location around Bracknell. The sets were designed by the art director Brian Eatwell.

Music
The theme song, also titled "I Start Counting", was sung by Lindsey Moore.

Casting
Young Phil Collins makes a little appearance as an ice cream vendor.

References

External links

online review

1970 films
1970s thriller films
British coming-of-age films
British thriller films
1970s English-language films
Films based on British novels
Films based on thriller novels
Films directed by David Greene
Films scored by Basil Kirchin
British serial killer films
United Artists films
Films shot at Bray Studios
Films shot in Berkshire
Films set in England
1970s British films